Fernão Vaz Dourado (c. 1520 in Goa – c. 1580 in Portuguese India) was a Portuguese cartographer of the sixteenth century, belonging to the third period of the old Portuguese nautical cartography, which is characterised by the abandonment of Ptolemaic influence in the representation of the Orient and introduction of better accuracy in the depiction of lands and continents. Little is known about this historical figure.

The known works of Dourado are of an extraordinary quality and beauty. He is considered one of the best cartographers of the time. Most of his manuscript charts are of relatively large scale and are included in nautical atlases. The following six atlas from the period 1568-1580 are known:

 1568 - 20 manuscript sheets on parchment, dedicated to D. Luís de Ataíde (Biblioteca Nacional, Madrid)
 1570 - 20 manuscript sheets on parchment (Huntington Library, San Marino, USA)
 1571 - 20 manuscript sheets on parchment, from which 2 (the frontispiece and the Eastern Mediterranean) were stolen in 1851 (Torre do Tombo, Lisbon).
 c. 1576 - 20 manuscript sheets on parchment (Biblioteca Nacional de Portugal, Lisbon)
 1575 - 21 manuscript sheets on parchment (British Library, London)
 1580 - 20 manuscript sheets on parchment (Biblioteca Nacional de Portugal, Lisbon)

The plates of all the atlases are reproduced, mainly in monochrome in Portugaliae Monumenta Cartographica.
The 1571 atlas was reproduced in colour, with a reconstructed frontispiece, and, inexplicably, with the Eastern Mediterranean plate from the 1576 atlas included without any explanation, in "Atlas de Fernao Vaz Dourado : reprodcao fidelissima do exemplar do Torre do Tombo, datado de Goa, 1571", Porto: Livraria Civilizacao, 1948.
The 1571 atlas was again reproduced in colour, in a boxed set of 18 loose sheets, as "Universal Atlas of Fernão Vaz Dourado", Barcelona: M. Moleiro Editor, S.A., 2012.

The 1568 atlas contains the first large-scale charts of Ceylon (Sri Lanka) and Japan, later copied by many other cartographers.

His chart of the northwestern coast of Africa, displayed above is executed using the so-called "plain chart model", where observed latitudes and magnetic directions were plotted directly into the plane, with a constant scale, as if the Earth were flat. Until the adoption of the Mercator projection charting method, this was the most advanced charting method in Europe.

References
 Fialho, João Ramalho (2007) – Navegações Portuguesas: Fernão Vaz Dourado.
 Cortesão A. and Mota, Teixeira da (1987)– Portugaliae Monumenta Cartographica. Imprensa Nacional – Casa da Moeda, Lisboa (in Portuguese and English).

Gallery

1520s births
1580s deaths
Portuguese cartographers
16th-century Portuguese people
16th-century cartographers